This is a list of rivers in the state of Oklahoma, listed by drainage basin, alphabetically, and by size. In mean flow of water per second, the Arkansas is Oklahoma's largest river, followed by the Red River and the Neosho River.

By drainage basin
This list is arranged by drainage basin, with respective tributaries indented under each larger stream's name.

Mississippi River

Red River

Mississippi River (LA)
Red River
Little River
Mountain Fork
Glover River
Kiamichi River
Buck Creek
Muddy Boggy Creek
Clear Boggy Creek
Blue River
Island Bayou
Washita River
Wildhorse Creek
Little Washita River
Beaver Creek
Cache Creek
East Cache Creek
West Cache Creek
Deep Red Creek
North Fork Red River
Sweetwater Creek
Elm Fork Red River
Salt Fork Red River
Prairie Dog Town Fork Red River

Arkansas River

Mississippi River (AR)
Arkansas River
Poteau River
James Fork
Fourche Maline
Lee Creek
Sans Bois Creek
Little Sans Bois Creek
Sallisaw Creek
Canadian River
North Canadian River
Deep Fork River
Lightning Creek
Beaver River
Palo Duro Creek
Coldwater Creek
Wolf Creek
Little River
Illinois River
Caney Creek
Baron Fork
Flint Creek
Neosho River (Grand River)
Elk River
Buffalo Creek
Spring Creek
Spring River
Verdigris River
Bird Creek
North Bird Creek
Middle Bird Creek
South Bird Creek
Coal Creek
Dirty Butter Creek
Flat Rock Creek
Fry Creek
Haikey Creek
Hominy Creek
Joe Creek
Mingo Creek
Caney River
Cimarron River
North Carrizo Creek
East Carrizo Creek
West Carrizo Creek
South Carrizo Creek
Skeleton Creek
Black Bear Creek
Red Rock Creek
Salt Fork Arkansas River
Chikaskia River
Medicine Lodge River

Alphabetically

Arkansas River
Baron Fork
Beaver River
Bird Creek
Black Bear Creek
Blue River
Buck Creek
Buffalo Creek
Cache Creek
Canadian River
Caney River
Chikaskia River
Cimarron River
Clear Boggy Creek
Deep Fork River
Elk River
Elm Fork Red River
Fourche Maline
Glover River
Grand River (the lower course of the Neosho River)
Illinois River
Island Bayou
James Fork
Kiamichi River
Lightning Creek
Little River (Oklahoma), tributary of Canadian River
Little River (Red River tributary)
Medicine Lodge River
Mountain Fork
Muddy Boggy Creek
Neosho River
North Canadian River
North Fork Red River
Poteau River
Prairie Dog Town Fork Red River
Red River
Red Rock Creek
Sallisaw Creek
Salt Fork Arkansas River
Salt Fork Red River
Sans Bois Creek
Spring Creek
Spring River
Sweetwater Creek
Verdigris River
Washita River

By size
Mean flow in cubic feet of water per second (cfs).  One cubic foot equals .0283 cubic meters.   

Source: "Annual Water Data Report" USGS, 2008. http://wdr.water.usgs.gov/wy2008/search.jsp; http://waterdata.usgs.gov/ok/nwis/current/?type=flow&group_key=NONE, accessed Dec 18,. 2010. Navigate to page 3 of reports of individual monitoring stations.  Average Water flow statistics will vary slightly from year to year.

See also

 List of lakes of Oklahoma
 List of rivers of the United States

References
USGS Geographic Names Information Service
USGS Hydrologic Unit Map - State of Oklahoma (1974)

External links
 Oklahoma Water Resources Board Maps
 Homepage of the Oklahoma Department of Wildlife Conservation
 Oklahoma Digital Maps: Digital Collections of Oklahoma and Indian Territory

Oklahoma
 
Rivers